Dingwall is a town and former royal burgh in the highlands of Scotland.

Dingwall may also refer to:

 Dingwall, Nova Scotia, Canada
 Dingwall of Kildun, a Scottish family 
 Dingwall Designer Guitars, a manufacturer of electric bass guitars 
 Lord Dingwall, a title in the Peerage of Scotland

See also
 Dingwalls, a live music and comedy venue, Camden, London, England